Valenti may refer to:

People
Valenti (surname)
Valentí, Catalan form of given name Valentin: 
Valentí Almirall i Llozer

Geography
Valenti rock (Βαλέντι), an islet near Crete

Music
Valenti (album), album by BoA 2003
Valenti (song), Japanese language song by BoA 2002